The Math Book (Sterling Publishing, 2009. ) is a book by American author Clifford A. Pickover.

Summary

The book contains 250 one-page articles on milestones in the history of math. Each article is followed by a related full-page color image.

Criticism
Pickover states, “The Latin translation [of Al-Khuwarizmi's Algebra] introduced the decimal positional number system to Europe” (84). Later, Pickover writes that Fibonacci's Liber Abaci "introduced the Hindu-Arabic numerals and decimal system to Western Europe" (100).

Reception

The book has consistently received good reviews.

The book has been praised by Martin Gardner.

The book is the winner of the Von Neumann Prize.

The book has been praised by Boing Boing.

References

External links
 Google Books
 GoodReads
 meatorama.com

Mathematics books
2009 non-fiction books